Blue Smoke is a 1935 British sports film directed by Ralph Ince and starring Tamara Desni, Ralph Ince, and Bruce Seton. It was made at Wembley Studios by the British subsidiary of the Fox Film Company.

The film's sets were designed by the art director Ralph W. Brinton.

Cast
 Tamara Desni as Belle Chinko  
 Ralph Ince as Al Dempson  
 Bruce Seton as Don Chinko  
 Ian Colin as Chris Steele 
 Eric Hales as Tawno Herne  
 Hal Walters as Stiffy Williams  
 Beryl de Querton as Anna Steele  
 Wilson Coleman as Jasper Chinko 
 Jock McKay as Mac  
 Bill Shine (actor) as Ted  
 Philip Ray as Jan  
 Ben Williams as Jenkins
 Gordon Bailey as Minor Role  
 Guy Belmore as Minor Role  
 Cecil Bevan as Minor Role

References

Bibliography
 Low, Rachael. Filmmaking in 1930s Britain. George Allen & Unwin, 1985.
 Wood, Linda. British Films, 1927-1939. British Film Institute, 1986.

External links

1935 films
British sports comedy films
British black-and-white films
1930s sports comedy films
1930s English-language films
Films directed by Ralph Ince
Films shot at Wembley Studios
20th Century Fox films
1935 comedy films
1930s British films